The Mercedes-Benz M137 engine was a naturally aspirated, SOHC 60° V12 engine, with three valves per cylinder. It was built to replace the larger and heavier, yet more powerful, DOHC, four valves per cylinder, naturally aspirated, 6.0 L M120 V12 unit. The M137 was used briefly between 1998 and 2002 for the W220 S-Class and C215 CL-Class. The architecture was similar to M112 and M113 engines and was designed to match the overall dimensions of a V8 unit with an undersquare internal measurements. The crankcase was cast in a lightweight alloy with "Silitec" (silicon/aluminium) cylinder liners to save weight. The new powerplant was 80 kg lighter than its predecessor and offered better fuel consumption thanks to a cylinder deactivation technology. Both displacement variants have 10:1 compression ratio.

The M137 was replaced by the more powerful twin-turbocharged M275 engine.

E58
Mercedes introduced M137 engine in its 5.8-litre form in S 600 and CL 600 models.

Applications:
 1998–2002 S 600
 1998–2002 CL 600

E63 AMG
In 2001 Mercedes and AMG introduced a series of special high-output models equipped with a larger-displacement M137 engine. Cars were available through AMG dealers only and sold to selected European and Asian customers. The 2001 S 63 AMG was produced in only 70 units. The 2001 CL 63 AMG existed in only 26 examples and the rarest of all was the 2002 G 63 AMG with only five units produced.

Applications:
 2001 S 63 AMG
 2001 CL 63 AMG
 2002 G 63 AMG

See also
 List of Mercedes-Benz engines

References

Mercedes-Benz engines
V12 engines
Gasoline engines by model